Standhope Peak, at  above sea level is the fourth highest peak in the Pioneer Mountains of Idaho. The peak is located in Salmon-Challis National Forest and Custer County.

References 

Mountains of Idaho
Mountains of Custer County, Idaho
Salmon-Challis National Forest